The National Yiddish Theatre Folksbiene, commonly known as NYTF, is a professional theater company in New York City which produces both Yiddish plays and plays translated into Yiddish, in a theater equipped with simultaneous superscript translation into English. The company's leadership consists of executive director Dominick Balletta and artistic director Zalmen Mlotek. The board is co-chaired by Sandra Cahn and Carol Levin.

History
Folksbiene (People's Stage) was founded in 1915, under the auspices of the fraternal and Yiddish cultural organization Workmen's Circle, on New York City’s Lower East Side, as an amateur theatre group with high artistic ideals. It is the oldest consecutively producing theater company in the United States, English or Yiddish, commercial or not. The era when it was founded is considered to be the height of Yiddish theater; at the time there were 15 Yiddish theatre companies in the Yiddish Theater District in New York and many more worldwide. Due to the destruction of European Jewry by the German Nazis, the Folksbiene is one of only five professional Yiddish theatre companies still in operation; also in New York City is the New Yiddish Rep, and the others are in Bucharest, Warsaw and Tel Aviv.

In late 2017, National Yiddish Theatre Folksbiene announced that it would stage the American premiere of Fiddler on the Roof in Yiddish, which has not been staged since its world premiere production in Israel more than 50 years ago. It was announced in a March 2018 issue of Forbes Magazine that Academy Award winner-and-Tony Award winner Joel Grey would direct the production. Their production Fidler Afn Dakh had its first preview on July 4, 2018. The opening performance was July 15, 2018. The production won the 2019 Drama Desk Award For Best Musical Revival.

The company's 2006 production of Di Yam Gazlonim, a Yiddish adaptation of The Pirates of Penzance, by Al Grand, was nominated for the 2007 Drama Desk Award for Outstanding Musical Revival, and their 2012/13 Off Broadway production of The Golden Land was nominated for the 2013 Drama Desk Award for outstanding Musical Revival. In the summer of 2012, Folksbiene announced their plans to create an international Festival of new works in celebration of their Centennial in 2015. A play contest accompanying the festival was juried by producer Emanuel Azenberg; the Tony Award-winning composer and songwriter Jason Robert Brown ("Parade"), and the playwrights Joe DiPietro (Tony Award for "Memphis"); Obie Award-winning Israel Horovitz, and Pulitzer Prize finalist Jon Marans ("Old Wicked Songs").

A revival of the 1923 operetta The Golden Bride in 2015/16 drew press attention as a New York Times Theatre Critics Pick and garnered Drama Desk awards as well. The Folksbiene was a producer on the 2015/16 Broadway play "Indecent."

In the Fall of 2017, the company staged an enhanced production of Abraham Goldfadn's The Sorceress as part of their restoration project – an endeavor that will restore lost or nearly lost Yiddish works to the canon of Yiddish culture. A fully stage production was mounted two years later in December 2019.

In 2022, the National Yiddish Theatre Folksbiene presented Harmony: A New Musical, the New York debut of the musical by Barry Manilow and his longtime collaborator Bruce Sussman. The musical tells the true story of the Comedian Harmonists, an ensemble of six talented young men in 1920s Germany who took the world by storm. The show ran at the Museum of Jewish Heritage from March 23 to May 8, 2022.

Production history
 2019: Hannah Senesh, The Sorceress, Harmony, The Tenth Man
 2018: Early Yiddish Theatre and Vaudeville Concert, Fidler Afn Dakh
 2017: Amerike the Golden Land, The Sorceress
 2016: Di Goldene Kale (The Golden Bride)
 2015: The Dybbuk, Di Goldene Kale (The Golden Bride)
 2014: The Megile of Itzik Manger
 2013: The Megile of Itzik Manger, Lies My Father Told Me
 2012: Shlemiel The First, The Golden Land
 2011: The Adventures of Hershele Ostropolyer
 2010: Fyvush Finkel Live!, New Worlds: A Celebration of I. L. Peretz. A Gilgul Fun a Nigun (The Metamorphosis of a Melody), The Adventures of Hershele Ostropolyer
 2009: Sholom Aleichem: Laughter Through Tears, Shpiel! Shpiel! Shpiel!]
 2008: Gimpel Tam, Di Ksube (The Marriage Contract)
 2006: Di Yam Gazlonim! (The Yiddish Pirates of Penzance), Bruce Adler in In a Guter Sho: A Yiddish Vaudeville
 2005: On Second Avenue
 2004: Di Kaprizne Kale (A Novel Romance), On Second A
 2002: Yentl, The Mazldiker Mystery Tour: A Kids and Yiddish Adventure
 2001: Kids and Yiddish 2001: A Space Mishegas – Spinning off in New Directions, Songs of Paradise: A Yiddish-English Musical
 2000: An American Family: A Musical Saga
 1999: Yoshke Muzikant (A Klezmers Tale)
 1998: Zise Khaloymes (Sweet Dreams)

See also
Zypora Spaisman
Shlemiel the First (play)

Notes

External links

Off-Broadway theaters
Jewish-American history
Jewish theatres
Jews and Judaism in Manhattan
Theatre companies in New York City
Yiddish culture in New York City
Yiddish-language literature
Yiddish theatre in the United States
Arts organizations established in 1915
Lower East Side
1915 establishments in New York (state)
Jewish organizations based in New York City